Hemeroblemma mexicana is a species of moth in the family Erebidae. The species is found in Mexico and Central America, including Honduras. A female was collected in Starr County, Texas, US, in 2012.

The larvae are injurious to the leaves of cacao in some years.

References

Moths described in 1852
Thermesiini